Stanislav Olejník (born 31 March 2002) is a Slovak footballer who plays for Spartak Myjava, on loan from Spartak Trnava, as a forward.

Club career

Spartak Trnava
Olejník made his professional Fortuna Liga debut for Spartak Trnava against Zemplín Michalovce on 8 August 2020.

Honours
Spartak Trnava
Slovnaft Cup: 2021–22

References

External links
 FC Spartak Trnava official club profile 
 Futbalnet profile 
 
 

2002 births
Living people
People from Levoča
Sportspeople from the Prešov Region
Slovak footballers
Association football forwards
1. FC Tatran Prešov players
FK Poprad players
FC Spartak Trnava players
Spartak Myjava players
2. Liga (Slovakia) players
Slovak Super Liga players